Octavio Fuentes Téllez (born 9 October 1972) is a Mexican politician from the Institutional Revolutionary Party. From 2007 to 2009 he served as Deputy of the LX Legislature of the Mexican Congress representing Chihuahua.

References

1972 births
Living people
Politicians from Chihuahua (state)
Institutional Revolutionary Party politicians
21st-century Mexican politicians
Deputies of the LX Legislature of Mexico
Members of the Chamber of Deputies (Mexico) for Chihuahua (state)